Mantis is the sixth studio album by progressive rock band Umphrey's McGee. The album was released on January 20, 2009. The album became available for pre-order on October 27, 2008.

Along with the pre-order announcement came information that unique bonus content would be available and more content would unlock depending on how many pre-orders were placed. This unusual method of distribution has been hailed as the "perfect way to implement a pre-order campaign".

The band has also continued to offer more bonus content to all purchasers of the album by releasing tracks online through PUSH Entertainment.  To access the content the physical CD is used as a key for logging onto the PUSH website. Live songs, some previously unreleased, have been added as well as the album's extended liner notes.  The bonus PUSH content has been updated every month since the album's release.

Unlike previous studio releases, Mantis is almost completely composed of material that the band had not played live prior to the album release. Over their 2008 New Year's Eve run "Made To Measure" made its live debut and was played again at the album release show with the addition of "Cemetery Walk." Several tracks feature sections similar to previous live improvisations (known to the band and fans as "Jimmy Stewarts"). Some of the music had been in the works as early as 1994.

Track listing

Bonus Content

Level 1

Level 2

Level 3

Level 4

Level 5

Level 6

Level 7

Level 8

Level 9 

The entire set from the 1/19 CD release show at the Vic Theatre is also included in level 9.

Chart performance

Personnel 
 Brendan Bayliss: guitar, vocals
 Jake Cinninger: guitar, keyboards, vocals
 Joel Cummins: keyboards, vocals
 Ryan Stasik: bass
 Kris Myers: drums, vocals
 Andy Farag: percussion

with

 Jeff Coffin: clarinets, saxophones
 Christoper Hoffman and Nathan Swanson: violins, violas, cellos
 Kevin Browning: engineer & producer
 Manny Sanchez: co-producer
 Mark Blanchette: photography & artwork
 David Plain: graphic design

References

External links 
 Album website (archived)

Umphrey's McGee albums
2009 albums